Non-governmental organizations (NGOs) in Azerbaijan are private organizations that typically serve philanthropic purposes. They can be established in accordance with government regulations.

NGOs of foreign countries are non-commercial, legitimate entities set up without explicit government authorization, but in conformance to such stipulations such as the Civil Code of the Republic. An NGO may be created and function for purposes not precluded by the structure and laws of Azerbaijan. However, formation and functioning of such NGOs within the Armed Forces are not permissible. An NGO cannot take part in municipal elections. These organizations are not allowed to provide any financial support to political parties.

NGOs can create their own flag, emblem and other symbols. However, they must not have any similarities with state symbols of Azerbaijan or other countries, as well as with the symbols of public authorities and other organizations. They must not violate trademarks.

List of NGO in Azerbaijan

References

External links 
List of Non-governmental organizations in Azerbaijan
The official website of NGO

Azer
Organizations based in Azerbaijan